The U.S. Senate Environment and Public Works Subcommittee on Transportation and Infrastructure is a subcommittee of the U.S. Senate Committee on Environment and Public Works.

Jurisdiction
Transportation and Infrastructure Issues
 Federal Highway Administration
 Highway Program
 Construction and maintenance of highways
 Public works, bridges, and dams
 General Services Administration
 Public Buildings and improved grounds of the United States generally, including Federal Buildings in the District of Columbia
 Green Building Standards
Water Issues
 Army Corps of Engineers (Civil Works)
 Water Resources Development Act
 National Dam Safety Program
 Flood control and improvements of rivers and harbors, including environmental aspects of deepwater ports
 Water resources
Regional Economic Development
 Economic Development Administration
 Appalachian Regional Commission
 Northern Border Regional Commission
 Delta Regional Authority
 Mississippi River Commission
Transportation
Federal Highway Administration

During committee organization for the 110th Congress, the subcommittee's responsibility over transportation safety and security issues was transferred to a new Subcommittee on Transportation Safety, Infrastructure Security, and Water Quality.

Members, 118th Congress

References

External links
Official Subcommittee page

Environment and Public Works Senate Transportation and Infrastructure